Dsungaripterus is a genus of dsungaripterid pterosaur with an average wingspan of . Dsungaripterus lived during the Early Cretaceous in what is now China, and its first fossil was found in the Junggar Basin.

Description

Like most dsungaripteroids it had a rather robust skeleton with thick walls and stouty bodily proportions, suggesting a mostly terrestrial lifestyle. The flight style of these animals is unclear, but it was probably punctuated by abrupt landings and extensive flapping.

Its most notable feature are its long, narrow, upcurved jaws with a pointed tip. It had no teeth in the front part of its jaws, which were probably used to remove prey from cracks in rocks and/or the sandy, muddy inland environments it inhabited. It had knobbly flat teeth more to the back of the jaw that were well suited for crushing the armor of shellfish or other hard objects.Dsungaripterus also had a palate similar to that of azhdarchoid pterosaurs.

History of discoveryDsungaripterus was described in 1964 named by Yang Zhongjian. The genus name combines a reference to the Junggar Basin with a Latinized Greek pteron, "wing". The type species is Dsungaripterus weii, the specific name honoring paleontologist C.M. Wei of the Palaeontological Division, Institute of Science, Bureau of Petroleum of Xinjiang. The holotype is IVPP V-2776, a partial skull and skeleton. From 1973 more material has been found including almost complete skulls.

In 1980 Peter Galton renamed Pterodactylus brancai (Reck 1931), a form from a late Jurassic African formation, into Dsungaripterus brancai, but the identification is now commonly rejected. In 1982 Natasha Bakhurina named a new species, Dsungaripterus parvus, based on a smaller skeleton from Mongolia. Later, this was renamed into "Phobetor", a preoccupied name, and in 2009 concluded to be identical to Noripterus. In 2002 a Dsungaripterus wing finger phalanx was reported from Korea.

Classification

 Dsungaripterus was classified by Yang as a member of the Dsungaripteridae. Below is a cladogram showing the results of a phylogenetic analysis presented by Andres and colleagues in 2014. They recovered Dsungaripterus within the clade Dsungaripteromorpha (a subgroup within the Azhdarchoidea), more specifically within the Dsungaripteridae, sister taxon to Domeykodactylus. Their cladogram is shown below.

In 2019, a different topology, this time by Kellner and colleagues, was published. In this study, Dsungaripterus was recovered outside the Azhdarchoidea, within the larger group Tapejaroidea, sister taxon to Noripterus''. The cladogram of the analysis is shown below.

See also

 List of pterosaur genera
 Timeline of pterosaur research

References

Dsungaripterids
Early Cretaceous pterosaurs of Asia
Taxa named by Yang Zhongjian
Fossil taxa described in 1964